The Madagascar Navy is the maritime component of the Madagascar People's Armed Forces.  The Madagascar Navy is under-equipped and undergoes difficulties in accomplishing its mission of maritime law enforcement, search and rescue,  and controlling the illegal fishing in the Malagasy exclusive economic zone.

Current fleet list

Naval flags

Bases
The main base of the Malagasy Navy is Antsiranana, that served already as a base to the colonial French Navy.
Naval detachments are also found in Nosy-Be, Mahajanga, Ile Sainte-Marie and in Fort-Dauphin.

References

Military of Madagascar
Madagascar